Xiaonanmen station may refer to:

 Xiaonanmen station (Shanghai Metro), a station on the Shanghai Metro in China
 Xiaonanmen MRT station, a station on the Taipei Metro in Taiwan